William Lewis Morton  (13 December 1908 – 7 December 1980) was a Canadian historian who specialized in the development of the Canadian west. Along with Arthur R. M. Lower and Donald Creighton he is regarded as one of the dominant Canadian historians of his generation.

Biography 
Morton was born on 13 December 1908 in Gladstone, Manitoba. He won a Rhodes Scholarship and attended the University of Oxford, where he studied history.  He returned to Canada to teach at Brandon College, the University of Manitoba, and then at Trent University. W. L. Morton served as head of the Department of History and Provost of University College of the University of Manitoba. He helped initiate the Canadian Centenary Series project and served as the Executive Editor for the nineteen-volume authoritative history of Canada. He served as president of the Canadian Historical Association from 1959 to 1960. Morton was one of the most prominent early faculty members of Trent University at Peterborough, Ontario, and was the first Master of the university's Champlain College.

Morton was a strong supporter of the Progressive Conservative Party and was very much a Red Tory. In 1969, he was made an Officer of the Order of Canada "for his contributions as an historian, teacher and author of several books on Canadian History."

Morton was a passionate nationalist and a conservative who fought against the liberal ideas that dominated Canadian thought after 1960, when the younger generation focused more on race, class, and gender as opposed to the national themes that intrigued Morton.

Morton died on 7 December 1980 in Medicine Hat, Alberta.

Works
Newfoundland in Colonial Policy, 1775–1793 (1935; BLitt thesis)
Third Crossing: A History of the Town and District of Gladstone in the Province of Manitoba (1946) 
The Progressive Party in Canada (1950; winner of the 1950 Governor General's Award for Nonfiction)
The London Correspondence Inward from Eden Colvile, 1849–1852 (1956)
Alexander Begg's Red River Journal and Other Papers Relative to the Red River Resistance of 1869–70 (1956)
Manitoba: A History (1957)
One University: A History of the University of Manitoba (1960)
The Canadian Identity (1961)
The Kingdom of Canada (1963)
The Critical Years: The Union of British North America, 1857–1873 (1964)
Manitoba: The Birth of a Province (1965)
Contexts of Canada's Past: Selected Essays of W.L. Morton (1980)

See also
 Conservatism in Canada

References

Further reading
 Berger, Carl. The Writing of Canadian History: Aspects of English-Canadian Historical Writing Since 1900 (2nd ed. 1987), pp 238–58.
 Berger, Carl, and Ramsay Cook, eds., The West and the Nation: Essays in Honour of W. L. Morton (1976).

External links
 Manitoba Historical Society - William Lewis Morton
 Chancellors of Trent University

1908 births
1980 deaths
20th-century Canadian historians
Alumni of St John's College, Oxford
Canadian Anglicans
Canadian male non-fiction writers
Canadian Rhodes Scholars
Governor General's Award-winning non-fiction writers
Historians of Canada
Officers of the Order of Canada
People from Central Plains Region, Manitoba
Progressive Conservative Party of Canada
Academic staff of Trent University
University of Manitoba alumni
Academic staff of the University of Manitoba
Presidents of the Canadian Historical Association